Muscle Shoals Nitty Gritty is a 1970 album by jazz flutist Herbie Mann. It was released on Mann's Embryo Records label, and distributed by Cotillion Records, a division of Atlantic Records.

Track listing
Side One  
"Muscle Shoals Nitty Gritty" (Mann) (6:47)
"Claudia Pie" (Mann) (4:38)
"Can You Dig It" (Ed Birdsong) (5:51)
Side Two
"Blind Willy" (Sonny Sharrock) (4:47)
"Come Together" (John Lennon, Paul McCartney) (10:00)
"Panama Red's Panama Hat" (Mann) (5:11)

Personnel

"Come Together"
Herbie Mann - flute
Roy Ayers - vibes
Eddie Hinton  - guitar
Barry Beckett - piano
David Hood & Miroslav Vitouš - bass
Roger Hawkins & Bruno Carr - drums

"Panama Red's Panama Hat”
As above, with Eddie Hinton - bottleneck guitar, Jimmy Johnson (also engineer) added on guitar

Other selections
Herbie Mann - flute
Richard Waters - drums
Andrew Love & Ed Logan - tenor saxophone
James Mitchell - baritone saxophone
Wayne Jackson - trumpet
Roy Ayers - vibes
Eddie Hinton - guitar
Barry Beckett - piano
David Hood - bass
Roger Hawkins - drums

"Can You Dig It"
As above, with Jimmy Johnson - guitar

"Blind Willy"
As above, with Roger Hawkins on Jews harp, replaced by Bruno Carr on drums
Album photography - Joel Brodsky
Album design - Haig Adishian

Production
Recorded at Muscle Shoals Sound Studios, Muscle Shoals, Alabama
Jimmy Johnson & Marlin Green - Recording engineers
Tom Dowd - Producer

Charting
The album peaked at #9 on the Billboard Jazz Album chart.

See also
Herbie Mann discography

References
Muscle Shoals Nitty Gritty, Herbie Mann. Embryo Records SD 526 (1970) (liner notes)

External links
Muscle Shoals Nitty Gritty at Allmusic.com

Herbie Mann albums
Crossover jazz albums
1970 albums
Albums with cover art by Joel Brodsky
Albums produced by Tom Dowd
Albums recorded at Muscle Shoals Sound Studio
Embryo Records albums